Patrick Street is the first studio album by the Irish folk band Patrick Street, released in 1986 on Green Linnet Records.

Recording
It was produced and engineered by Dónal Lunny, and recorded at Landsdowne Studios, Dublin, Ireland.

The founding members Andy Irvine, Kevin Burke, Jackie Daly and Arty McGlynn were joined by Lunny on keyboards and bodhrán.

Track listing
All tracks Traditional; arranged by Patrick Street; except where indicated
 "Patrick Street"/"The Carraroe Jig" – 4:07 
 "Walter Sammon's Grandmother"/"Concertina Reel"/"Brendan McMahon's" – 4:16
 "The Holy Ground" (song) (Gerry O'Beirne) – 5:39 
 "The Shores of Lough Gowna"/"Contentment is Wealth"/"Have a Drink with Me" – 5:01
 "The Set"/"La Cardeuse" – 3:11 
 "Loftus Jones" – 3:31 
 "The Dream" (Andy Irvine) / "Indiana" (song) (Andy Mitchell) – 6:58 
 "Martin Rochford's Reel"/"Roll out the Barrel"/"The Earl's Chair" – 3:41
 "Mrs O'Sullivan's Jig"/"Caliope House" (Dave Richardson) – 3:29
 "The Man with the Cap" (Colum Sands) – 4:04

Personnel
 Andy Irvine - vocals, mandolin, bouzouki, harmonica
 Kevin Burke - fiddle
 Jackie Daly - accordion
 Arty McGlynn - guitar
 Dónal Lunny - producer, keyboards, bodhrán

References

External links
Patrick Street at Allmusic website
Patrick Street at MusicBrainz website
Patrick Street at Discogs website
Patrick Street at Adastra website

1986 debut albums
Patrick Street albums